Zuri is a given name of Swahili origin meaning “beautiful.” It has been among the 1,000 most popular names for newborn girls in the United States since 2010 and among the top 300 names since 2018. Zuri was among the five most popular names for Black newborn girls in the American state of Virginia in 2022.

Women
Zuri Hall (born 1988), American entertainment reporter, television personality, actress and producer
Zuri Tibby (born 1995), American model

Men
Zuri Lawrence (born 1970), American professional boxer

Notes